Indian Creek is a stream in Decatur County, Iowa and 
Harrison County, Missouri. It is a tributary of the Thompson River.

The confluence is in northeastern Harrison County approximately four miles north-northeast of the community of Cainsville.

Indian Creek took its name from the Indians who once used the area as a hunting ground.

See also
List of rivers of Iowa
List of rivers of Missouri

References

Rivers of Decatur County, Iowa
Rivers of Harrison County, Missouri
Rivers of Iowa
Rivers of Missouri